Thea Fleming (also Flemming; born 1942 in Sittard) is a Dutch film actress who spent much of her career in Italy, sometimes credited as Isabella Biancini. She started her career in 1960 as the Dutch Brigitte Bardot. Besides her career as an actress and photo model she also starred in and directed several fotonovelas.
 
Fleming has a brother in the Netherlands.

Selected filmography
 1960 From a Roman Balcony (uncredited)
 1961 Letto a tre piazze – Thea (uncredited)
 1961 Mariti a congresso
 1963 I mostri – Marilina street walker (segment "Vernissage", uncredited)
 1963 Il Successo
 1963 Taur, il re della forza bruta – Illa
 1964 I marziani hanno 12 mani
 1965 Operation Counterspy
 1965 Salome '73
 1966 Our Man in Casablanca – Ingrid van Heufen 
 1966 Mondo pazzo... gente matta! – Anna (Maurizio's fiancée)
 1967 The Million Dollar Countdown – Huguette
 1969 Kill Rommel! -Woman auxiliary
1972 Come fu che Masuccio Salernitano, fuggendo con le brache in mano, riuscì a conservarlo sano

References

External sources 
 

1942 births
Living people
20th-century Dutch actresses
Dutch film actresses
People from Sittard